"Glory" is a song by American rapper Jay-Z featuring his daughter Blue Ivy Carter (credited as B.I.C.) and background vocals from Pharrell Williams. Produced by The Neptunes (Williams & Chad Hugo), it premiered on Jay-Z's official website LifeandTimes.com on January 9, 2012, two days after his wife Beyoncé gave birth to the couple's first child Blue. "Glory" impacted US urban contemporary radio stations on January 17, 2012. The melodic hip hop is an emotional homage to Jay-Z's baby girl and wife. Lyrically, "Glory" is about the experience and the happiness of becoming a father for the first time. It also details the heartbreak the couple suffered over a previous miscarriage. The song opens with Blue's first heartbeat, and includes a sample of Blue's cries towards the end. The song contains samples from "The Most Beautifullest Thing in This World", written and performed by rapper Keith Murray.

Background
On January 7, 2012, Beyoncé gave birth to her and Jay-Z's first child, Blue Ivy Carter, at Lenox Hill Hospital in New York. Two days later, Jay-Z released "Glory" on his social website LifeandTimes.com. Produced by The Neptunes, the song was composed in honor to Blue Ivy Carter, who is credited on it. It impacted US urban contemporary radio playlists on January 17, 2012.

Composition and lyrical interpretation
"Glory" is an emotional hip hop song dedicated to Blue Ivy Carter and Knowles, as Jay-Z sings "You're my child with the child from Destiny's Child." Lyrically, it features Jay-Z experiencing the overwhelming joy of fatherhood for the first time, "The most amazing feeling I feel / Words can't describe what I'm feeling, for real / Baby I'll paint the sky blue / My greatest creation was you." Describing Blue as "the most beautiful thing in this world", he promises to keep her happy — in contrast to his own troubled childhood, which was marred by the departure of his dad, Adnis Reeves. 
 Jocelyn Vena of MTV News commented that the concept of the song revolves around the glory of fatherhood.

"Glory" opens with Blue's heartbeat, followed by a rap verse: "The most amazing feeling I feel, words can't describe what I'm feeling for real / Baby, I paint the sky blue, my greatest creation was you". As the song progresses, Jay-Z reveals that the baby girl was conceived in Paris, a day before Knowles shot the cover artwork for her fourth studio album 4 (2011). It also details Jay-Z's and Knowles' pregnancy struggles, including a miscarriage Knowles suffered previously, shown in the lines: "False alarms and false starts, all made better by the sound of your heart", and "Last time the miscarriage was so tragic / We was afraid you'd disappear / But nah baby you magic". In reference to Aaliyah’s 2001 passing, Jay Z also urges Blue to exercise safety, with the lyric, "Just make sure the plane you’re on is bigger than your carry-on baggage". At the end of "Glory", Blue Ivy Carter can be heard crying.

Critical reception
Touré of Time magazine called "Glory" one of the "greatest love songs in hip-hop history". Chris Randle of The Village Voice wrote that the song "sounds humbled and relieved, and soft enough to bear some marks; at certain points, Jay's voice almost seems to quaver." He added that Jay-Z "goes from revealing a past miscarriage to sharing the precise date of conception, as if still ambling through the ward in elated exhaustion." Maura Johnston of the same publication noted that "Glory" was "happy and humbled just like all those shots of new dads in movies; you can almost smell the cigars being lit as Jay tosses off his first (but probably not last) dedication to his daughter, which has as its best line 'You're the child of a child from Destiny's Child.'" SF Weeklys Shona Sanzgiri noted that the "rapper [is] celebrating with a strange mixture of certainty and guilelessness" in the song. She added that "Glory" is a "condensed saga, where the revelations range from somewhat brazen... to somber". David K. Li, Josh Saul, and Tata Palmeri of the New York Post wrote that "the emotional song may win over even Jay-Z's harshest critics". Rob Markman of MTV News praised "Glory" saying that Jay-Z recorded his "most personal thoughts... and then tops things off by adding the crying and cooing bundle of joy to the track, effectively giving baby girl her very first feature". David Marchese of Spin magazine felt that "Jay spouts all sorts of fatherly sentiment on the track". Jody Rosen of Rolling Stone awarded the song with three-and-a-half out of five stars, praising its "lilting Neptunes beat". He further compared the song with "Isn't She Lovely?" (1976) by Stevie Wonder saying that it's "mixing exultant proud-papa sentiments with brand-consolidation braggadocio: 'A pinch of Hov, a whole glass of B.' But the mood is reflective. 'Everybody go through stuff... Life is a gift, love, open it up.'"

Chart performance
The song debuted at number 74 on the US Hot R&B/Hip-Hop Songs chart issue dated January 21, 2012, with 1.7 million audience impressions, according to Nielsen BDS. It also debuted at number 23 on the US Rap Songs chart issue dated January 28, 2012. As Jay-Z's daughter, Blue, is officially credited on the song, she became the youngest person in history to have a charted song on any Billboard chart ever.

Music video
The official music video for "Glory" was released on April 16, 2015.

Charts

Release history

References

Jay-Z songs
Song recordings produced by the Neptunes
2012 songs
2012 singles
Songs about parenthood
Songs about pregnancy
Songs written by Jay-Z
American contemporary R&B songs
American soul songs